State Road 878 (SR 878), named the Snapper Creek Expressway, is a  east–west electronic toll road south of Miami, Florida. The expressway is named for the nearby Snapper Creek which runs parallel to SR 878. It acts as a spur route of SR 874 (Don Shula Expressway), providing access to U.S. Route 1 (US 1) near South Miami and local access to the eastern Kendall area while bypassing the Dadeland district. The road is maintained and tolled by the Miami-Dade Expressway Authority (MDX).

Route description
 SR 878's western terminus is integrated into the Don Shula Expressway's interchange with SR 94 (Kendall Drive) across the boundary of the Kendall and Sunset districts. Motorists entering the Don Shula Expressway northbound from Kendall Drive are given the option of continuing onto SR 874 via a flyover, or else merging into the traffic leaving SR 874 for the Snapper Creek Expressway, which then heads under the Kendall Drive–Don Shula Expressway flyover. Southbound motorists from the Don Shula Expressway wishing to exit to Kendall Drive merge into this carriageway before leaving for SR 94 with those vehicles originating from the Snapper Creek Expressway. There is no direct connection for southbound motorists on SR 874 to head east on SR 878; likewise, westbound motorists on SR 878 cannot head north along SR 874 directly.

It then meets Galloway Road (SR 973) shortly afterwards with a diamond interchange. The expressway then enters Glenvar Heights once it crosses SR 973 and remains in that district for the rest of its duration.

Immediately afterwards, SR 878 turns to the southeast and prepares to meet its eastern terminus at the South Dixie Highway (US 1) at a surface intersection  later, passing under the Metrorail line and associated MetroPath just before doing so. Traffic heading south along US 1 from eastbound SR 878 moves into a slip lane, while that wishing to head north along US 1 enters it at an oblique angle, aided by traffic signals. The only access onto SR 878 westbound from US 1 is for southbound traffic; motorists heading north along US 1 are guided to SR 878 by signage along Southwest 67th Avenue and Southwest 80th Street.

Tolls
SR 878's tolls are entirely electronic: cash cannot be accepted along its length. Payment is done either via SunPass transponders or via toll-by-plate billing, the latter of which attracts a higher cost. Two toll gantries are located along the Snapper Creek Expressway, the first between the Don Shula Expressway and Galloway Road, and the second between Galloway Road and Southwest 72nd Avenue. The relationship between the tolling points and interchanges along SR 878 and SR 874 is that all motorists are charged at least one toll for using the road; there are no "free sections". As of July 1, 2013, the cost for a two-axle vehicle to travel the entire length of the Snapper Creek Expressway is $0.50 with a SunPass transponder, or $1.00 via the toll-by-plate program. Each additional axle on a vehicle attracts an extra $0.25 via SunPass or $0.50 via toll-by-plate for each toll gantry passed.

History
Planning by Dade County for a road named the "Snapper Creek Expressway" was underway as early as 1958, with a final completion date set as late as 1975. Funding for SR 878's construction was made available in 1971 by the Florida Department of Transportation as part of plans to construct the Snapper Creek Expressway along with the South Dade Expressway (now known as the Don Shula Expressway) and the West Dade Expressway (now known as the Homestead Extension of Florida's Turnpike), with an expected completion date of early 1973. Construction was halted in 1974 due to money issued from county bonds for expressway building running out, and the road was left partially completed; however, $8 million in federal emergency funds was directed to completing the expressway in late 1977. The Snapper Creek Expressway, designated SR 878, finally opened in early 1980, with the Southwest 72nd Avenue interchange opening a few weeks later.

No tolls were collected along SR 878, in line with the road's original plans, until MDX's initial roll-out of open road tolling from late 2009 to mid-2010 on its road network. Tolling along the Snapper Creek Expressway began on July 17, 2010. The move to toll the Snapper Creek Expressway angered local residents, but was tempered by MDX's move to investigate toll rebates. Initially, tolls were $0.25 for SunPass users, with a $0.15 surcharge for motorists using the toll-by-plate system. The toll-by-plate rate increased by ten cents on July 1, 2013, to $0.50 per toll gantry passed, while the SunPass rate was unaffected.

Exit list

See also

References

External links

SR 878 in Florida at SouthEastRoads

878
878
878
Freeways in the United States